Victor Eeckhout (1821–1879) was a Belgian painter, noted for his genre works and paintings with Orientalist subject matter.

Life and career
The son of painter, Jacob Joseph Eeckhout, Victor was born at Antwerp in 1821. He received his early art education from his father. 

He travelled to the East, a major source of inspiration for many of his artworks. He was enamoured of Morocco and found it much more interesting and with more characters than Algiers. In Morocco, he met up with the artist, Jean Portaels and the pair spent time drinking mint tea and discussing art. 

He died in 1879 in Tangiers.

Work
Select List of Paintings
 The Entrance to the Souk, Tangiers, 1869
 Ruins at Tangiers, 

Gallery

See also

 List of Orientalist artists
 Orientalism

References

  page 457

1821 births
1879 deaths
Belgian genre painters
Artists from Antwerp
Orientalist painters

19th-century Belgian painters
19th-century Belgian male artists